The Fliptones are American record producers and songwriters consisting of Chaz Mishan and David Delazyn. Classically trained musicians, the duo have production and song writing credits with Jason Derulo, J.Lo, Flo-Rida, G-Dragon, Samantha Jade, Lil Wayne and Britney Spears. They were both born and raised in Miami but currently live in Los Angeles.

Production discography

References

American male songwriters
Songwriters from Florida
Record producers from Florida
Record production duos
Songwriting teams